We Are Together with Russia is a pro-Russian collaborationist organization operating in the Russian-occupied Zaporizhzhia Oblast and supported by the Russian authorities. It is being described by itself as an "integration movement". The movement actively advocates the accession of the region to the Russian Federation, and according to the Ukrainian media it is actively involved in the preparation of "referendums" on the occupied Ukrainian territories becoming part of Russia. Its activities are being organized by the United Russia party and the All-Russia People's Front, headed by Vladimir Putin.

"We are together with Russia" is actively cooperating with the authorities of the Russian regions, who have taken "patronage" over the Zaporizhzhia Oblast According to its own statement, the movement "delivers the necessary humanitarian aid, medicines to the Zaporizhzhia Oblast and sends experienced workers to restore normal life."

History 

In early July 2022, Vladimir Rogov, a member of the main council of the military-civilian administration of the Zaporizhzhia Oblast, said that the movement had begun to formate. Rogov said that "On the basis of "We are together with Russia" Public Councils will be created, in which all those who are not indifferent are encouraged to participate."

The first public headquarters of the movement were opened at the end of July 2022.

On 17 July, Rogov posted in his Telegram channel a photo of the new road sign at the entrance to the Zaporizhzhia region, with the of the region written in Russian and the logo of We Are Together with Russia.

On 30 July, the pro-Russian collaborators held a "We Are Together with Russia" forum in occupied Kherson Oblast at the Kherson State University. which ended with creation of the Public Chamber of the Kherson Oblast and the declaration "Russian Kherson" being adopted. The Zaporizhia organisation has participated in the forum.

On 30 August, according to the movement, a partisan attack took place near the headquarters of the movement in Berdiansk.

On 5 September, according to the movement, two Ukrainian drones attacked the headquarters of the organization in Enerhodar.

On 7 September, the chairman of the movement, Vladimir Rogov, said that "Zaporizhzhia Oblast will focus on holding a vote on joining Russia on November 4." Earlier, such a date for the referendum was announced by Secretary General of United Russia Andrey Turchak.

In the evening of the same day, the headquarters of the movement in Melitopol was blown up. The fact of the explosion was confirmed by the Ukrainian mayor of Melitopol Ivan Fedorov.

On 20 September 2022, the movement turned to the head of the occupation administration of the Zaporizhzhia Oblast, Yevgeny Balitsky, with a request to hold a “referendum on joining Russia.” According to Volodymyr Rogov, chairman of the movement, "the congress delegates noted that this would forever restore peace in the Zaporozhye region and give impetus to the development of the region, as well as stop the aggression of the Ukrainian regime against civilians."

See also
Collaboration with Russia during the 2022 Russian invasion of Ukraine
Donetsk Republic (political party)

References 

2022 establishments in Ukraine
Political parties established in 2022
Russian irredentism
Russian political parties in Ukraine
Secessionist organizations in Europe
Separatism in Ukraine
Ukrainian collaboration with Russia